Beaurepaire  station is a commuter rail station operated by operated by Exo in Beaconsfield, Quebec, Canada, located in the Beaurepaire neighborhood. It is served by  the Vaudreuil–Hudson line.

 on weekdays, 9 of 11 inbound trains and 10 of 12 outbound trains on the line call at this station, the exceptions in both cases being one short turn and one skipped stop. On weekends, all trains (four on Saturday and three on Sunday in each direction) call here.

The station is located at the corner of Elm Avenue and Woodland Avenue, north of Autoroute 20. It has two side platforms; access between them is provided by the Woodland Avenue level crossing. The station is equipped with shelters but there is no station building.

The first Beaurepaire station, opened by 1902, was located east of Woodland Avenue. It was replaced by the current station, located just east of the original site, by 1972.

Bus connections

Société de transport de Montréal

References

External links
 Beaurepaire Commuter Train Station Information (RTM)
 Beaurepaire Commuter Train Station Schedule (RTM)
 2016 STM System Map

Exo commuter rail stations
Railway stations in Montreal
Beaconsfield, Quebec